The Artxanda Funicular is a funicular railway in the city of Bilbao in Spain's Basque Country. It links downtown Bilbao with the recreational area at the summit of the nearby Artxanda Mountain, which has a park, several restaurants, a hotel, a sports complex, and offers panoramic views of the city.

History
A cable railway to the top of the Artxanda mountain was first proposed in 1901, but not built due to lack of finance. The current funicular was opened in 1915. During the Spanish Civil War the funicular was damaged by bombing, but reopened in 1938. The funicular closed in 1976 after an accident that injured several employees of the operating company, and did not reopen again until April 1983. The line was closed again in August of the same year, as a result of flood damage, and did not reopen until November.

Operation
The Bilbao departure point of the funicular is just north of Zubizuri bridge, on the right bank of the River Nervion, within walking distance of the Guggenheim Museum. Services run every 15 minutes throughout the day. Tickets can be bought at the stations, or the Barik card can be used.

The funicular is run by the Funicular de Artxanda S.A., a company wholly owned by the Municipality of Bilbao.

Technical parameters
The funicular has the following technical parameters:

Length: 770.34 meters
Height: 226.49 meters
Maximum steepness: 44,98 %
Capacity: 70 people per car
Trip time: 3 minutes
Maximum speed: 5 metres per second
Configuration: Single track with passing loop
Traction: Electricity

References

External links

 

Transport in Bilbao
Funicular railways in Spain
Rail transport in the Basque Country (autonomous community)
Buildings and structures in Bilbao
Tourist attractions in Bilbao
Metre gauge railways in Spain
1915 establishments in Spain
Railway lines opened in 1915